Friedrich "Fritz" Kreisler (February 2, 1875 – January 29, 1962) was an Austrian-born American violinist and composer. One of the most noted violin masters of his day, and regarded as one of the greatest violinists of all time, he was known for his sweet tone and expressive phrasing. Like many great violinists of his generation, he produced a characteristic sound which was immediately recognizable as his own. Although it derived in many respects from the Franco-Belgian school, his style is nonetheless reminiscent of the gemütlich (cozy) lifestyle of pre-war Vienna.

Biography 

Kreisler was born in Vienna, the son of Anna (née Reches) and Samuel Kreisler, a doctor. Of Jewish heritage, he was however baptised at the age of 12. He studied at the Vienna Conservatory between 1882-1885 under Anton Bruckner, Jakob Dont and Joseph Hellmesberger Jr., and in Paris Conservatory between 1885-1887, where his teachers included Léo Delibes, Lambert Massart and Jules Massenet. He was graduated from Paris Conservatory with a degree of "Premier Prix" gold medal at the age of 12, competing against 40 other players, all of whom were at least 20 years of age.

He made his United States debut at the Steinway Hall in New York City on November 10, 1888, and his first tour of the United States in 1888–1889 with Moriz Rosenthal. He then returned to Austria and applied for a position in the Vienna Philharmonic, but was turned down by the concertmaster Arnold Rosé. As a result, he left music to study medicine. He spent a brief time in the army before returning to the violin in 1899, when he gave a concert with the Berlin Philharmonic conducted by Arthur Nikisch. It was this concert and a series of American tours from 1901 to 1903 that brought him real acclaim. Kreisler was also an excellent pianist, and his piano playing is preserved on Ampico reproducing piano rolls.

During a concert tour of the United States in 1901, Kreisler met Harriet Lies, a New York-born divorcée who was a Vassar graduate and the daughter of a German American tobacco merchant. They fell in love immediately and were married a year later, though they repeated the ceremony three more times because of legal technicalities.  They had no children, and Harriet devoted her life to his career.  They were married for 60 years, until his death in 1962.

In 1910, Kreisler gave the premiere of Sir Edward Elgar's Violin Concerto, a work commissioned by and dedicated to him. He served briefly in the Austrian Army in World War I before being honourably discharged after he was wounded. He arrived in New York on November 24, 1914, and spent the remainder of the war in America. He returned to Europe in 1924, living first in Berlin, then moving to France in 1938.  Shortly thereafter, at the outbreak of World War II, he settled once again in the United States, becoming a naturalized citizen in 1943. He lived there for the rest of his life, giving his last public concert in 1947, and broadcasting performances for a few years after that.

On April 26, 1941, he was involved in a serious traffic accident. Struck by a truck while crossing a street in New York, he suffered a fractured skull and was in a coma for over a week.

In his later years, he suffered from not only some hearing loss but also sight deterioration due to cataracts.

Kreisler died of a heart condition aggravated by old age in New York City in 1962. He was interred in a private mausoleum in Woodlawn Cemetery, the Bronx, New York City.

Legacy 
Kreisler wrote a number of pieces for the violin, including solos for encores, such as "Liebesleid" and "Liebesfreud". Some of Kreisler's compositions were pastiches ostensibly in the style of other composers. They were originally ascribed to earlier composers, such as Gaetano Pugnani, Giuseppe Tartini and Antonio Vivaldi, and then,  in 1935, Kreisler revealed that it was he who wrote the pieces. When critics complained, Kreisler replied that they had already deemed the compositions worthy: "The name changes, the value remains", he said. His cadenzas for the Beethoven concerto are the ones most often played by violinists today.

He wrote the music for the 1936 movie The King Steps Out directed by Josef von Sternberg, based on the early years of Empress Elisabeth of Austria.

Kreisler performed and recorded his own version of the first movement of Paganini's D major Violin Concerto. The movement is rescored and in some places reharmonised, and the orchestral introduction is completely rewritten in some places. The overall effect is of a late-nineteenth-century work.

Kreisler owned several antique violins made by luthiers Antonio Stradivari, Pietro Guarneri, Giuseppe Guarneri, and Carlo Bergonzi, most of which eventually came to bear his name. He also owned a Jean-Baptiste Vuillaume violin of 1860, which he often used as his second violin, and which he often loaned to the young prodigy Josef Hassid. In 1952 he donated his Giuseppe Guarneri to the Library of Congress in Washington, D.C. where it remains in use for performances given in the library.

On recordings, Kreisler's style resembles that of his younger contemporary Mischa Elman, with a tendency toward expansive tempi, a continuous and varied vibrato, expressive phrasing, and a melodic approach to passage-work. Kreisler makes considerable use of portamento and rubato. The two violinists' approaches are less similar in big works of the standard repertoire, such as Felix Mendelssohn's Violin Concerto, than in smaller pieces.

A trip to a Kreisler concert is recounted in Siegfried Sassoon's 1928 autobiographical novel Memoirs of a Fox-Hunting Man.

The Australian manufacturer of electronics and consumer goods Kriesler (later a subsidiary of Philips) supposedly took its name after Fritz Kreisler but had intentionally misspelled the name as to avoid possible juristical actions from other parties.

Work

Compositions

Recordings 
Kreisler recorded extensively for Victor/RCA Victor and HMV. His recordings have been reasonably well represented on both LP and CD reissues. His final recordings were made in 1950.
Bach Concerto for Two Violins in D minor, BWV 1043, with Efrem Zimbalist (second violin), and a string quartet. rec. January 4, 1915;
Beethoven Violin Concerto in D major, Op. 61, with Leo Blech, Berlin State Opera Orchestra. rec. December 15, 1926;
Beethoven Violin Concerto in D major, Op. 61, with John Barbirolli, London Philharmonic Orchestra. rec. June 16, 1936;
Beethoven Sonata No. 8 in G major, Op. 30, No. 3, with Sergei Rachmaninoff, pF. rec. March 22, 1928;
Beethoven Sonata No. 9 in A major, Op. 47, with Franz Rupp, pf. rec. June 17–19, 1936;
Brahms Violin Concerto in D major, Op. 77 with Leo Blech, Berlin State Opera Orchestra, rec. November 21, 1927;
Brahms Violin Concerto in D major, Op. 77 with John Barbirolli, London Symphony Orchestra, rec. June 18, 1936;
Grieg Sonata No. 3 in C minor, Op. 45, with Sergei Rachmaninoff, pf. rec. December 14–15, 1928;
Mendelssohn Violin Concerto in E minor, Op. 64, with Leo Blech, Berlin State Opera Orchestra. rec. December 9, 1926;
Mendelssohn Violin Concerto in E minor, Op. 64, with Landon Ronald, London Symphony Orch. rec. April 8, 1935;
Mozart Violin Concerto in D major, K. 218, with Landon Ronald, London Symphony Orchestra, rec. December 1, 1924;
Paganini Violin Concerto in D major, Op. 6 (recomposed by Kreisler), with Eugene Ormandy, Philadelphia Orchestra, rec. December 13, 1936;
Schubert Sonata No. 5 in A major, D. 574, with Sergei Rachmaninoff, pf. rec. December 20, 1928;
attrib. Vivaldi, RV Anh. 62 (composed by Kreisler) Violin Concerto in C major, with Donald Voorhees, RCA Victor Orchestra, rec. May 2, 1945.

Broadway 

Apple Blossoms (1919) – operetta – co-composer;
Continental Varieties (1934) – revue – featured composer for "Caprice Viennois" and "La Gitana";
Reunion in New York (1940) – revue – featured composer for "Stars in Your Eyes";
Rhapsody (1944) – operetta – composer.

Autobiography

Notes

References

Further sources

External links 

 Fritz Kreisler's page at Carl Fischer
 
 
 
 
 
 
 An assembled edition of original pieces and arrangements for violin and piano by Fritz Kreisler. From Sibley Music Library Digital Scores Collection
 Fritz Kreisler String Quartet in a minor Soundbites & discussion of work
 Fritz Kreisler recordings at the Discography of American Historical Recordings.
 Recordings of Fritz Kreisler on the Library of Congress jukebox
 The International Fritz Kreisler Violin Competition
 

1875 births
1962 deaths
19th-century American composers
19th-century Austrian people
19th-century classical composers
19th-century classical violinists
19th-century male musicians
20th-century American composers
20th-century American male musicians
20th-century Austrian people
20th-century classical composers
20th-century classical violinists
American classical violinists
American male classical composers
American people of Austrian-Jewish descent
American Roman Catholics
American Romantic composers
Austrian classical violinists
Austrian Jews
Austrian male classical composers
American male violinists
Austrian Romantic composers
Austro-Hungarian emigrants to the United States
Austro-Hungarian Jews
Burials at Woodlawn Cemetery (Bronx, New York)
Converts to Roman Catholicism
Jewish classical composers
Jewish classical violinists
Male classical violinists
Music & Arts artists
People from Leopoldstadt
Royal Philharmonic Society Gold Medallists
20th-century American violinists